Alexander Bessmertnykh may refer to:

Alexander Bessmertnykh (politician) (born 1933), Soviet and Russian foreign minister and diplomat
Alexander Bessmertnykh (skier) (born 1986), Russian cross-country skier